Fausto Lurati (29 August 1929 – 28 July 2015) was a Swiss cyclist. He competed in the individual and team road race events at the 1952 Summer Olympics.

References

External links
 

1929 births
2015 deaths
Swiss male cyclists
Olympic cyclists of Switzerland
Cyclists at the 1952 Summer Olympics
Sportspeople from Lugano